Richard L. Abrams (born April 20, 1941 in Cleveland, Ohio) was president of the Optical Society of America in 1990. Abrams holds both a bachelor's degree and a Ph.D. from Cornell University. He worked at Bell Labs from 1968-1971 and then worked at Hughes. At Hughes, Abrams was chief scientist, Defense Systems Division, Hughes' Space and Communications Group, and was responsible for applying technology to the communication spacecraft. Abrams retired as chief scientist of Hughes Research Laboratories in 1996. Currently, Abrams is continuing his career as a part-time consultant, primarily for the U.S. government.

See also
Optical Society of America#Past Presidents of the OSA

References

External links
 Articles Published by early OSA Presidents Journal of the Optical Society of America

Vision scientists
21st-century American physicists
Cornell University alumni
Fellows of Optica (society)
Presidents of Optica (society)
Living people
1941 births